The 2006 College Football All-America Team is composed of the following All-American Teams: Associated Press, Football Writers Association of America, American Football Coaches Association, Walter Camp Foundation, The Sporting News, Sports Illustrated, Pro Football Weekly, CBS Sports, ESPN, College Football News, Rivals.com, and Scout.com.

The College Football All-America Team is an honor given annually to the best American college football players at their respective positions. The original usage of the term All-America seems to have been to such a list selected by football pioneer Walter Camp in the 1890s. The NCAA officially recognizes All-Americans selected by the AP, AFCA, FWAA, TSN, and the WCFF to determine Consensus All-Americans.

Nineteen players were recognized as consensus All-Americans for 2006, 8 of them unanimously. Unanimous selections are followed by an asterisk (*)

Offense

Quarterbacks
Troy Smith, Ohio State (AP, AFCA, FWAA, TSN, Walter Camp, SI, PFW, ESPN, CBS, CFN, Rivals.com, Scout.com)
Brady Quinn, Notre Dame (AP-2)
Colt Brennan, Hawaii (AP-3)

Running backs
Darren McFadden, Arkansas (Associated Press, AFCA-Coaches, All-Purpose, FWAA-Writers, Walter Camp, Sporting News, Sports Illustrated, Pro Football Weekly, ESPN, CBS Sports, Rivals.com, Scout.com)
Steve Slaton, West Virginia (Associated Press, AFCA-Coaches, FWAA-Writers, Walter Camp, Sporting News, Scout.com)
Marshawn Lynch, California (AFCA-Coaches)
Ian Johnson, Boise State (Sports Illustrated, CBS Sports)
Mike Hart, Michigan (College Football News, Rivals.com)
Jonathan Stewart, Oregon (Pro Football Weekly)

Fullbacks
Brian Leonard, Rutgers (Pro Football Weekly, ESPN, Scout.com)

Wide receivers
Calvin Johnson, Georgia Tech (CFHOF) (AP, AFCA, FWAA, TSN, WCFF, SI, PFW, CBS, CFN, Rivals.com, Scout.com)
Dwayne Jarrett, Southern California (AP, WCFF, SI, Scout.com) 
Robert Meachem, Tennessee (FWAA, TSN, ESPN, CFN, Rivals.com)
Jeff Samardzija, Notre Dame (FWAA)
Johnnie Lee Higgins, UTEP (AFCA)
Jarett Dillard, Rice (ESPN)
Steve Smith, Southern California (CBS)

Tight ends
Matt Spaeth, Minnesota (Associated Press, Rivals.com)
Zach Miller, Arizona State (AFCA-Coaches, Walter Camp)
Jonny Harline, BYU (Sporting News, Sports Illustrated, ESPN, CBS Sports, College Football News, Scout.com)

Offensive linemen
Joe Thomas, Wisconsin (CFHOF) (Associated Press, AFCA-Coaches, FWAA-Writers, Walter Camp, Sporting News, Sports Illustrated, Pro Football Weekly, ESPN, CBS Sports, College Football News, Rivals.com, Scout.com)
Jake Long, Michigan (Associated Press, AFCA-Coaches, FWAA-Writers, Walter Camp, Sports Illustrated, Pro Football Weekly, ESPN, CBS Sports, Rivals.com, Scout.com)
Justin Blalock, Texas (Associated Press, AFCA-Coaches, FWAA-Writers, Walter Camp, Sporting News, Pro Football Weekly, ESPN, CBS Sports, College Football News, Rivals.com, Scout.com)
Arron Sears, Tennessee (AFCA-Coaches, Walter Camp, College Football News)
Sam Baker, Southern California (FWAA-Writers, Sporting News, CBS Sports)
Steve Vallos, Wake Forest (Sporting News, Sports Illustrated, College Football News)
Josh Beekman, Boston College (Associated Press)
Ben Grubbs, Auburn (Pro Football Weekly, ESPN, Rivals.com)
Alex Boone, Ohio State (Sports Illustrated)
Mike Jones, Iowa (Scout.com)

Centers
Dan Mozes, West Virginia (Associated Press, AFCA-Coaches, FWAA-Writers, Walter Camp, Sporting News, Sports Illustrated, ESPN, CBS Sports, College Football News, Rivals.com, Scout.com)
Ryan Kalil, Southern California (Pro Football Weekly)

Defense

Ends
Gaines Adams, Clemson (Associated Press, AFCA-Coaches, FWAA-Writers, Walter Camp, Sporting News, Sports Illustrated, Pro Football Weekly, ESPN, CBS Sports, College Football News, Rivals.com)
LaMarr Woodley, Michigan (Associated Press, AFCA-Coaches, FWAA-Writers, Walter Camp, Sporting News, ESPN, CBS Sports, Rivals.com, Scout.com)
Justin Hickman, UCLA (FWAA-Writers, Walter Camp, Sporting News)
Bruce Davis, UCLA (Sports Illustrated, College Football News)
Jarvis Moss, Florida (Pro Football Weekly)
Anthony Spencer, Purdue (Scout.com)

Tackles
Glenn Dorsey, LSU (Associated Press, AFCA-Coaches, Sports Illustrated, Pro Football Weekly, CBS Sports, Rivals.com)
Quinn Pitcock, Ohio State (Associated Press, AFCA-Coaches, Walter Camp, Sporting News, ESPN, CBS Sports, College Football News, Rivals.com, Scout.com)
Eric Foster, Rutgers (FWAA-Writers)
Alan Branch, Michigan (Sports Illustrated, Pro Football Weekly, ESPN, Scout.com)
Sedrick Ellis, Southern California(College Football News)

Linebackers
Patrick Willis, Mississippi (Associated Press, FWAA-Writers, Walter Camp, Sporting News, Sports Illustrated, Pro Football Weekly, ESPN, CBS Sports, College Football News, Rivals.com, Scout.com)
James Laurinaitis, Ohio State (Associated Press, FWAA-Writers, Walter Camp, Sporting News, Sports Illustrated, ESPN, CBS Sports, Rivals.com, Scout.com)
Paul Posluszny, Penn State (Associated Press, Walter Camp, ESPN, Rivals.com, Scout.com)
Rufus Alexander, Oklahoma (AFCA-Coaches, CBS Sports)
Buster Davis, Florida State (AFCA-Coaches)
H.B. Blades, Pittsburgh (FWAA-Writers, Sports Illustrated)
Dan Connor, Penn State (Sporting News, Pro Football Weekly)
Vince Hall, Virginia Tech (College Football News)
Ameer Ismail, Western Michigan (College Football News)
Jon Beason, Miami-FL (Pro Football Weekly)

Defensive backs
Leon Hall, Michigan (Associated Press, AFCA-Coaches, FWAA-Writers, Walter Camp, Pro Football Weekly, CBS Sports, College Football News, Rivals.com, Scout.com)
Dante Hughes, California (Associated Press, AFCA-Coaches, Walter Camp, Sporting News, Sports Illustrated, ESPN, CBS Sports, Rivals.com, Scout.com)
Reggie Nelson, Florida (Associated Press, FWAA-Writers, Walter Camp, Sporting News, Sports Illustrated, ESPN, CBS Sports, College Football News, Rivals.com, Scout.com)
Aaron Ross, Texas (FWAA-Writers, Walter Camp, Sports Illustrated, Pro Football Weekly, ESPN, College Football News)
Eric Weddle, Utah (AFCA-Coaches, Sporting News, Sports Illustrated, CBS Sports, College Football News, Rivals.com)
LaRon Landry, LSU (Associated Press, AFCA-Coaches, Pro Football Weekly, ESPN)
Dwight Lowery, San Jose State (AFCA-Coaches, FWAA-Writers)
Michael Griffin, Texas (Pro Football Weekly, Rivals.com, Scout.com)
John Talley, Duke (Sporting News)

Special teams

Kickers
Justin Medlock, UCLA (Associated Press, AFCA-Coaches, FWAA-Writers, Sporting News, CBS Sports, College Football News, Scout.com)
Mason Crosby, Colorado (Walter Camp, Pro Football Weekly)
Sam Swank, Wake Forest (Sports Illustrated, ESPN, Rivals.com)

Punters
Daniel Sepulveda, Baylor (Associated Press, AFCA-Coaches, FWAA-Writers, Walter Camp, Sporting News, Sports Illustrated, Pro Football Weekly, ESPN, CBS Sports, College Football News, Rivals.com, Scout.com)

All-purpose / return specialists
DeSean Jackson, California (Associated Press- All-purpose player, FWAA-Writers, Sporting News, Walter Camp-KR, Sports Illustrated, Pro Football Weekly-WR and PR, ESPN, CBS Sports, College Football News, Rivals.com, Scout.com)
Marcus Thigpen, Indiana (Sporting News, Sports Illustrated, Pro Football Weekly, ESPN, College Football News, Rivals.com)
Ted Ginn Jr., Ohio State (Rivals.com- All-purpose player)

See also
 2006 All-Big Ten Conference football team
 2006 All-Big 12 Conference football team
 2006 All-Pacific-10 Conference football team
 2006 All-SEC football team

References

External links

 2006 Coaches All-American Team
 2006 Writers All-American Team
 2006 Walter Camp Foundation All-American Team
 2006 Sporting News All-American Team
 2006 Sports Illustrated All-American Team

 2006 Pro Football Weekly All-American Team
 2006 ESPN.com All-American team
 2006 CBS Sportsline All-American Team
 2006 College Football News All-American Team
 2006 Rivals.com All-American Team
 2006 Scout.com All-American Team

All-America Team
College Football All-America Teams